Broock is a village and a former municipality  in the Ludwigslust-Parchim district, in Mecklenburg-Vorpommern, Germany. Since 1 January 2009, it is part of the town Lübz.

Villages in Mecklenburg-Western Pomerania